Tania Naden (born 20 February 1992) is an Australian rugby union player. She plays for the Brumbies in the Super W competition. 

Naden has been with the Brumbies since the inaugural Super W season in 2018. She made her first starting appearance in the second round of the 2022 season against the Melbourne Rebels.

In 2022, Naden played for the Australian Barbarians team against Japan, in the latters Australian tour. She was named in the Wallaroos squad for the Rugby World Cup in New Zealand.

References

External links 

 Wallaroos Profile

1992 births
Living people
Australia women's international rugby union players
Australian female rugby union players